Bakan may refer to:

People
Bakan (surname)

Places
Bakan District in Pursat Province, Cambodia
Wat Bakan, a pagoda in Bakan District
Bakan, Iran (disambiguation)
Shimonoseki, a city in Yamaguchi Prefecture, Japan, known before 1902 as